James Duane (1733–1797) was a member of the Continental Congress and mayor of New York City.

James Duane may also refer to:
 James Duane (fireboat), a fireboat of New York City named after the mayor
 James Duane (professor) (born 1959),  American lawyer
 James Chatham Duane (1824–1897), engineering officer in the Union Army during the American Civil War

See also
 James Duane Doty (1799–1865), land speculator and politician

Duane, James